Esta Es Mi Vida (English: This Is My Life) is the debut album by duo Jesse & Joy, consisting of siblings Jesse and Joy Huerta. The album was released by Warner Music Mexico on August 22, 2006. The album debuted at number 22 on Mexican Top 100 Album Chart and peaked at number 7. The Asociación Mexicana de Productores de Fonogramas y Videogramas (AMPROFON) certified the album as Platinum for selling more than 100,000 copies in Mexico. They promoted their album in Puerto Rico, Spain and Latin America.

Five singles were released from the album: "Espacio Sideral", "Ya No Quiero", "Volveré", "Llegaste Tú" and "Somos Lo Que Fue". "Espacio Sideral" reached the number 35 on the Billboard Hot Latin Songs chart, and was certified as Gold in Mexico by the AMPROFON. "Ya No Quiero" reached the number 40 in the Hot Latin Songs, while "Llegaste Tú" the number 32. An acoustic "sessions" version was released in March 2007, titled Esta Es Mi Vida Sesiones. It includes songs by Jesse & Joy and a cover of "Ironic" (1995) by Alanis Morissette. On August 29, 2007 the album received a Latin Grammy nomination for Best Pop Album by a Duo/Group with Vocals. In 2008 an extended play, titled Esto Es Lo Que Soy, was released. It includes the singles released from Esta Es Mi Vida (excepting "Somos Lo Que Fue"), and a new single called "Esto Es Lo Que Soy".

Track listing
All songs written by Jesse & Joy, except where noted.

Credits and personnel
Credits adapted from Esta Es Mi Vida album notes.
Lead vocals: Joy Huerta
Chorus: Jesse Huerta, Joy Huerta
Guitar, bass and piano: Jesse Huerta
Bass in "Nadie Podrá": Kiko Cibrián
Additional guitar in "Espacio Sideral": James Harrat
Drums: Ilan Rubin
Hammond B3: Rob Whitlock
Piano and chorus in "Somos Lo Que Fue": Noel Schajris
Chorus in "Ser O Estar (Si Tú No Estás)": Leonel García
Recorded by: Kiko Cibrián, Ben Moore and Julian Tydelski

Charts

Certifications

References

2006 debut albums
Jesse & Joy albums
Spanish-language albums
Warner Music Latina albums